The cuneiform Ar sign, .—is a cuneiform sign that is a combined sign, containing Ši (cuneiform), and Ri (cuneiform). It is used in one prominent name in the Amarna letters, for Šuwardata, as well as in a number of Amarna letters. "Ar" is also used in the Epic of Gilgamesh, and other texts.

Epic of Gilgamesh usage
The Ar sign usage in the Epic of Gilgamesh is as follows: ar-(21 times).

References

Moran, William L. 1987, 1992. The Amarna Letters. Johns Hopkins University Press, 1987, 1992. 393 pages.(softcover)
 Parpola, 1971. The Standard Babylonian Epic of Gilgamesh, Parpola, Simo, Neo-Assyrian Text Corpus Project, c 1997, Tablet I thru Tablet XII, Index of Names, Sign List, and Glossary-(pp. 119–145), 165 pages.

Cuneiform signs